Diego Antonio Castillo Méndez (born 18 January 2001) is a Chilean badminton player. In 2016, he won the Chile International tournament in men's doubles event partnered with Alonso Medel.

Achievements

BWF International Challenge/Series 
Men's doubles

  BWF International Challenge tournament
  BWF International Series tournament
  BWF Future Series tournament

References

External links 
 

2001 births
Living people
Chilean male badminton players
21st-century Chilean people